Chicken Invaders is a series of shoot 'em up video games created by Greek indie developer Konstantinos Prouskas. With the release of the first game Chicken Invaders in 1999, the games are one of the longest running series of video games developed in Greece. All six main entries in the series have been developed by Prouskas' InterAction studios, and have been released for Microsoft Windows, OS X, Linux, iOS, Windows Phone, and Android platforms.

The main theme of the games is a battle between a lone combat spacecraft and a technologically advanced race of space-faring chickens, who are intent on subjugating (and later destroying) Earth. The games make heavy use of humor, especially in the form of parodies of Galaxian, Star Wars, Space Invaders and Star Trek.

Games

Main series

Chicken Invaders 
Chicken Invaders is the first game of the Chicken Invaders franchise, released on 24 July 1999. It is a fixed shooter, reminiscent of the original Space Invaders (of which the game is a parody of), in which the player controls a lone spacecraft by moving it horizontally across the bottom of the screen and firing at swarms of invading extraterrestrial chickens. The game features both single player and two-player game modes. Known also as the DX Edition, it is a reimagined, 3D version of an earlier, unfinished DOS version made in 1997.

Chicken Invaders features weapon power-ups that resemble gift boxes, used by the player to upgrade their weapons. Enemy chickens drop eggs as projectile weapons, which the player needs to avoid. When chickens are defeated, they drop drumsticks, which the player can collect to earn a missile, a special weapon used to clear the screen of enemies. The game features an infinite amount of levels. Each level features 10 waves, and at the end of each level players fight a boss, which must be defeated in order to advance (or warp) to a new system. The gameplay is endless, bringing in wave after wave, until the player has finally lost all of their lives, in which case the game is over. The difficulty increases each time players advance to a new chapter; the enemies move or fall faster, and objects like asteroids will also move faster.

Chicken Invaders is the only game in the franchise to not feature "holiday editions", a trend which would become a staple of the franchise. It is also the only game in the series to be an exclusive Microsoft Windows title, and as such the only game to not have been ported to other platforms.

Chicken Invaders: The Next Wave 
Chicken Invaders: The Next Wave (known also as Chicken Invaders 2) is the second game in the main Chicken Invaders series, released on 22 December 2002. The player again takes command of the same lone spacecraft of the previous installment and must eliminate the chicken infestation of the Solar System. The game is considered a major improvement over its predecessor, featuring a variety of unique waves of chickens with different types of enemies and bosses, as well as allowing the player to move their ship in both the horizontal and vertical directions. It is also the first game in the franchise to introduce multiple weapons. The game departs from the "endless" format, instead featuring a final boss confrontation and an ending. As in the previous entry in the series, The Next Wave can be played by one or two players.

The Next Wave features eleven chapters, each one corresponding to a gravitationally rounded object of the Solar System. Players start the campaign moving inwards from Pluto, with the final chapter of the game taking place on the Sun, where players confront the Mother-Hen Ship. Each Chapter consists of 10 waves of attacking hostiles, resulting in a total of 110 different levels. In all the waves, chickens attack the player's ship by dropping eggs, which the player needs to avoid. Players can collect different items to help them in-game, such as new primary weapons which players earn by collecting parcels, and power-ups, which can be used to upgrade the current primary weapon. Weapons can be upgraded up to eleven levels. As in Chicken Invaders, players can collect chicken drumsticks and roasts to receive missiles, powerful weapons that can wipe out an entire wave of enemies. Incentives are given however for not using the missiles, as players may receive special bonuses (e.g. new weapons or extra firepower) if they opt to take on the wave head on.

The Next Wave was the first game in the franchise to feature a special version of the game (an edition) based around certain holidays. Chicken Invaders: The Next Wave - Christmas Edition was released on 25 November 2003, and was initially intended to be available during the months leading up to Christmas, however, its popularity caused InterAction studios to release this, and all subsequent Editions as standalone games. The Christmas Edition of The Next Wave replaces game graphics, sounds and music with festive versions and elements related to the Christmas holiday.

Both versions of the game received Remastered versions, which were released on 20 December 2011 (the Christmas Edition) and on 26 January 2012 (the regular edition). These versions feature HD graphics, orchestral high-quality music, automatic fire function, progress saving, new languages, etc.

The game and its Christmas Edition were initially released for Microsoft Windows, and have since been ported to MacOS, Linux, iOS, Android and Windows Phone.

Chicken Invaders: Revenge of the Yolk 
Chicken Invaders: Revenge of the Yolk (known also as Chicken Invaders 3) is the third game in the Chicken Invaders main series, released on 11 November 2006 as a Christmas Edition, with the regular version releasing on 20 January 2007. The game is similar to The Next Wave in many respects, with the addition of new game mechanics and featuring 4-player cooperative play. It was intended as the final game in a planned Chicken Invaders trilogy, until the release of Ultimate Omelette in 2010.

Revenge of the Yolk features a plot and cutscenes, while waves and enemies are more diverse than in the previous entries. The game has 120 waves, in 10 levels across 12 systems in the galaxy. New game mechanics added include unlockable content in the form of additional features which first have to be unlocked by finishing the game, that can either make the game easier or harder, as well as a variety of cosmetic changes. Furthermore, Revenge of the Yolk was the first game to introduce an overheating mechanic, designed to discourage players from holding down the fire button. The game features 30 bonuses, while weapons can be powered up to 12 power levels (the last one being a secret).

Revenge of the Yolk is the only game in the franchise to be preceded by an Edition version, with its Christmas Edition being released almost 1,5 month earlier. The game was also the first to spawn an Easter Edition, released on 12 February 2010.

Chicken Invaders: Ultimate Omelette 

Chicken Invaders: Ultimate Omelette (known also as Chicken Invaders 4) is the fourth main installment in the Chicken Invaders series, released on 29 November 2010 as a demo, with the full version releasing a week later. It is the first game in the series to be released on Valve's Steam platform, and the first to receive an accolade, as it was included in the Adrenaline Vaults Top Casual PC games of 2010.

Ultimate Omelette further added game mechanics to the Revenge of the Yolk formula, most notably the ability to rotate the player's ship to face in any direction, depending on the level (instead of constantly facing 'up', as in the previous installments). The game further features a more 'cinematic' camera zooming in or out depending on the action (e.g. boss fights typically have the camera zoomed out to contain all the action). The game features a more intricate plot than its predecessors, new weapons, dockable ship upgrades (Satellites) to deal additional damage to the various enemies and bosses, and in-game currency (Keys), dropped by specific enemies (indicated by a golden halo) during the course of the game, which allow the player to purchase unlockable content. Ultimate Omelette contains 120 waves across 12 Chapters. As is the case with Revenge of the Yolk, the player's ship primary weapons can be upgraded through 11 power levels, plus a secret 12th.

Ultimate Omelette had a Christmas Edition released on 24 November 2011, an Easter Edition released on 11 March 2012, and a Thanksgiving Edition (the only Edition in the series to be themed around the Thanksgiving holiday), which was released on 15 November 2013.

 Chicken Invaders: Cluck of the Dark Side Chicken Invaders: Cluck of the Dark Side (known also as Chicken Invaders 5) is the fifth game in the main series released for Microsoft Windows, OS X, Linux, iOS, Android, and Windows Phone. The beta release of the game was announced on 26 July 2014 and was completed in October, with the game receiving a final release on 21 November 2014.

The game shares many similarities with its predecessors, with notable additions including a Spaceship Customization mode, which allows players to change the Hero's M-404 PI's color and paintjob, and the Artifact Recovery Mission chapters, where players explore various different Planets. Furthermore, new weapons were added, along with a Mission Progress screen which shows player progress.

Thematic Editions of the game include the Halloween Edition released on 2 October 2015, and the Christmas Edition released on 19 September 2016.

Spin-off games
 Chicken Invaders Universe  Chicken Invaders Universe is a spin-off game in the Chicken Invaders franchise released on 14 December 2018 in early access. The game is an MMO, in which players, as recruits fresh out of the Heroes Academy, join the ranks of the United Hero Force to fight against the fowl Henpire.

On 14 July 2018, InterAction studios released the first teaser for the game, while on 14 August 2018, the official website for the game was created. As of 14 October 2022, the release date was set to be with the games' anniversary on 15 December 2022, which might come with Stable and Beta branch.

Reception
The Chicken Invaders series has been positively received. CNET gave the first Chicken Invaders 4 out of 5 stars, highlighting the graphics and sound but criticizing the game's lack of features, and repetitive gameplay. CNET also gave The Next Wave 4 out of 5 stars, again praising the graphics, but criticizing the lack of a windowed mode. The Next Wave was rated "mediocre" by GameSpot, criticizing the repetitive gameplay and indistinct enemy bullets. However, the colorful, cartoony graphics where highlighted, as were "flashes of understanding of what makes a good shooter".

Shortly after Ultimate Omelettes release, it was included in Adrenaline Vault's "Top Casual PC Games of 2010" list. The reviewer described it as "the most fun arcade space shooter in a very, very long time". The original orchestral soundtrack was also praised as rousing, invigorating, and "simply the absolute best".

Gamezebo gave Ultimate Omellete, a 4 out of 5 stars rating, stating that "Chicken Invaders 4 is fantastic for a first-timer to the series", but criticizing that "for veterans of the games, it will feel a little too samey. The action has improved somewhat over the course of the series, but it’s still really the same ideas and premise that ran through the other games. Hence, those who are not new to the games may feel that paying full price for this latest release is a little too much."

Reception of the fifth game in the series, Cluck of the Dark Side has likewise been favorable. The game currently has "Overwhelmingly Positive" reviews on the Steam store, and was voted as "Greek Game of the Year" by Greek media and entertainment website GameWorld.gr users in its annual Game of the Year Awards 2015.

References

External links 
 

Android (operating system) games
Indie video games
IOS games
Linux games
MacOS games
Scrolling shooters
Shoot 'em ups
Video game franchises
Windows games
Windows Phone games
Video games about birds
Video games developed in Greece